Cerebral Ballzy is an American punk rock band from Brooklyn, New York, United States. The band was formed in 2008 and released their debut, self-titled, album on 26 July 2011. The album was released in full as an online preview on the Revolver magazine website.

Cerebral Ballzy are known for their love of 1980s punk, along with a keen interest in drinking, girls, pizza and skateboarding. The band has received praise for their debut single "Insufficient Fare" and their energetic live performances. According to lead singer Honor Titus, the name Cerebral Ballzy came from a friend who dropped a slice of pizza on a train track and picked it up.  Honor said "That was ballsy" and his friend replied "Cerebral Ballsy!", a play on the congenital disorder cerebral palsy. Titus is the son of rapper Andres "Dres" Titus, of the acclaimed alternative hip hop duo Black Sheep.

The band has completed a tour of the United States and played major European festivals including Hevy Music Festival, Sonisphere Festival, Lowlands, Pukkelpop, Soundwaves, Roskilde, Eurockéennes and Latitude. They played at the Summer Sonic Festival in Japan and the Reading and Leeds festivals in the United Kingdom in August 2011, headlined the 2013 NME Radar Tour, and have played with Flag, Black Lips, The Horrors, Japanther, GBH, The King Blues and FEAR. In 2013, under the management of David Bason, Cerebral Ballzy were signed to Julian Casablancas's label Cult Records.

Following their 2014 release of Jaded & Faded, Cerebral Ballzy parted ways with guitar player Mason. They performed with Mason on Last Call with Carson Daly on 6 May 2014. It is alleged that Mason left the band shortly after while they were on tour with OFF! in 2014.

Discography

Albums

Studio albums

Extended plays

Live albums

Singles

Music videos

Members
 Honor Titus – lead vocals
 Melvin Honore (Mel) – bassist
 Jason Bannon – guitarist
 Tom Kogut – drummer
Abraham Sanabria – drummer

References

External links
 Official Website
 Record Label's Site
 Music Brainz

Hardcore punk groups from New York (state)
Musical quintets
Cult Records artists